John Hagel (or John Hagel III) is a management consultant and author.

Hagel has spent over 40 years in Silicon Valley. He is the founder of two technology startups and served as the Senior Vice President for Strategic Planning at Atari, Inc. He spent 16 years at McKinsey & Company, where he helped open their Silicon Valley office and served as a leader of their strategy practice as well as founded their e-commerce practice in 1993. Hagel has also been a consultant at Boston Consulting Group.

In 2007, Hagel founded the Deloitte Center for the Edge, a Silicon Valley-based research center. The Center for the Edge now has offices in Amsterdam and Melbourne.

Hagel is also involved with several other organizations, including the World Economic Forum, where he currently serves as co-chair of the Global Future Council on the Future of Platforms and Systems. He is also on the Board of Trustees of the Santa Fe Institute, an organization that conducts research on complex adaptive systems, and Independent Institute. Additionally, he hosts executive roundtables at the Aspen Institute.

He is credited with inventing the term "infomediary" in his book, NetWorth, co-authored with Marc Singer, and published by the Harvard Business School Press in 1999.

Hagel has been published in business publications including The Economist, Fortune, Forbes, Business Week, Financial Times and Wall Street Journal as well as in mainstream media such as the New York Times, NBC and BBC.He has also been awarded two prizes by the Harvard Business Review for Best Article and been called an industry thought leader by the World Economic Forum and Business Week. Hagel also blogs at Edge Perspectives, the Harvard Business Review, Fortune and Techonomy.

Major positions and roles
 Co-Chairman of the Deloitte Center for the Edge (present)
 Santa Fe Institute  Board of Trustees
 Aspen Institute
 The Independent Institute  Board of Directors
 Advisory board member of open innovation vendor Innovation Exchange
 Fellow, World Economic Forum

Education, degrees and awards
 MBA - Harvard Business School  1978
 JD - Harvard Law School  1978
 B.Phil. - Oxford University  1974
 BA - Wesleyan University  1972

Publications
 John Hagel III, John Seely Brown: Lang Davison, The Power of Pull: How Small Moves, Smartly Made, Can Set Big Things In Motion, Basic Books 2010. .
 John Hagel III, John Seely Brown, How World Of Warcraft Promotes Innovation; in: Willms Buhse/Ulrike Reinhard: Wenn Anzugträger auf Kapuzenpullis treffen (When Suits meet Hoodies), whois-Verlag 2009. .
 John Hagel III, John Seely Brown, The Only Sustainable Edge: Why Business Strategy Depends On Productive Friction And Dynamic Specialization, Harvard Business Review Press 2005. .
 John Hagel III, John Seely Brown, Out of The Box: Strategies for Achieving Profits Today and Growth Tomorrow Through Web Services, Harvard Business Press 2002. .
 John Hagel III, Marc Singer, Net Worth: Shaping Markets When Customers Make the Rules, Harvard Business Review Press 1999. .
 John Hagel III, Arthur G. Armstrong, Net Gain: Expanding Markets through Virtual Communities, Harvard Business Review Press 1997. .
 John Hagel III, Assessing the Criminal, Restitution, Retribution and the Legal Process, Ballinger Publishing 1977. .
 John Hagel III, Alternative Energy Strategies: Constraints and Opportunities, Praeger 1976.

References

External links

 John Hagel's website

Living people
Wesleyan University alumni
Harvard Law School alumni
Harvard Business School alumni
Santa Fe Institute people
McKinsey & Company people
Year of birth missing (living people)